Statistics of First League of FR Yugoslavia for the 1995–96 season.

Overview 
Just as in the two previous seasons, the league was divided into 2 groups, A and B, consisting each one of 10 clubs. Both groups were played in league system. By winter break all clubs in each group meet each other twice, home and away, with the bottom four classified from A group moving to the group B, and being replaced by the top four from the B group. At the end of the season the same situation happened with four teams being replaced from A and B groups, adding the fact that the bottom two clubs from the B group were relegated into the Second League of FR Yugoslavia for the next season and replaced by the top two from that league.

At the end of the season FK Partizan were the champions.

The league top-scorer was FK Čukarički striker Vojislav Budimirović with 23 goals.

The relegated clubs were FK Napredak Kruševac and FK Radnički Beograd.

Autumn

IA league

Table

Results

IB league

Table

Results

Spring

IA league

Table

Results

IB league

Table

Results

IA Playoff

Relegation playoff

Winning squad
Champions: Partizan Belgrade (Coach: Ljubiša Tumbaković)

Players (league matches/league goals)
  Ivica Kralj
  Nikola Damjanac
  Viktor Trenevski
  Bratislav Mijalković
  Darko Tešović
  Gjorgji Hristov
  Ivan Tomić
  Dražen Bolić
  Mladen Krstajić
  Predrag Pažin
  Đorđe Svetličić
  Dejan Peković
  Dejan Vukićević
  Damir Čakar
  Dragan Ćirić
  Zoran Mirković
  Niša Saveljić
  Zoran Đurić
  Igor Taševski
  Albert Nađ
  Marko Marković
  Rahim Beširović
Source:

Top goalscorers

References

External links 
 Tables and results at RSSSF

Yugoslav First League seasons
Yugo
1995–96 in Yugoslav football